St Leonard's Place is a street in the city centre of York, in England.

History
The site street lay mostly within the walls of Roman Eboracum, and two Anglo-Saxon carved stones and a large coin hoard have been discovered in excavations in the area.  The location formed part of St Leonard's Hospital in the Mediaeval period, which from 1546 until 1698 was a royal mint, leading to the area becoming known as "Mint Yard".  In 1675, Mint Yard was bought by the Corporation of York, for £543.

The construction of the street was proposed in 1831, with the intention that it would be built up with "genteel private residences".  The street runs across the line of the York city walls, a section of which were demolished, along with the barbican of Bootham Bar.  Although there were plans to entirely demolish Bootham Bar, this did not occur.  The street opened in 1835, and construction of the houses was completed in 1842.

In 1844 workmen digging a drain discovered a hoard of c.10,000 Northumbrian stycas, many of which were subsequently sold privately. However a portion of the hoard is now part of the collection at the Yorkshire Museum.

The expense of constructing the street left the York Corporation in debt.  This included paving the street with Macadam, and providing a new facade for the York Theatre Royal, which had previously faced Little Blake Street, but from 1835 had its main entrance on St Leonard's Place.  The street became a popular area for entertainment, with the York Subscription Library opening in 1836, the Yorkshire Club operating for a time at 5 St Leonard's Place, and the De Grey Rooms, used for concerts and meetings, opening in 1842.  The new York and North Midland Railway opened its head office on the street.  Initial residents included the Recorder of York, C. H. Elsby; the town clerk, Robert Davies; and the architect John Harper.

In 1933, the 99-year leases on many houses on the street expired, and the Corporation of York then turned the street's main terrace into council offices.  It left the terrace in 2013, after which it was converted back into housing.  The street forms part of York's inner ring road, and although the council have investigated pedestrianising it, this would require provision of an alternative route, including a new bridge across the River Ouse.

Layout and architecture

The street runs north, from the junction of Blake Street, Duncombe Place and Museum Street, gently curving to Exhibition Square, where it meets High Petergate and Bootham.

Much of the western side of the street is taken up by the terrace of 1-9 St Leonard's Place, designed by John Harper and completed in 1834.  There is also a small garden with a stretch of the Roman city wall, before the street opens up into Exhibition Square.  On the eastern side lie De Grey House, completed in 1835, and for many years from 1909 the York Conservative Club; the De Grey Rooms; and the York Theatre Royal.

References

Streets in York